The Pīṭhīpatis of Bodh Gaya (also known as the Pithis) were the rulers of the area around Bodh Gaya from roughly the 11th to 13th centuries in the Magadha region of what is now Bihar in India. Pithi refers to the diamond throne where the Buddha was said to have gained enlightenment.

The Pithipati chiefs styled themselves with the title of Acarya in addition to Pīṭhīpati. Pithipati Buddhasena also termed himself as magadhādipati (ruler of Magadha).

Origin
The historian, Dineshchandra Sircar, noted that the Pithipatis appear to have originally been religious authorities and priests before eventually coming into power themselves at some point in the 11th century during the Pala rule of the region and the Pithis themselves were likely subordinates of the Pala dynasty. Pithipati inscriptions refer to the clan name as Chinda and Chikkora. Kumaradevī, the daughter of Devaraksita, calls her father a Chikkora, while a later descendant, Jayasena, calls his ancestors Chinda indicating the use of different family names.

History

The first king of this dynasty was Vallabharāja whose rule of Bodh Gaya is confirmed by the Sarnath inscription of Kumaradevi in the 12th century who was one of the wives of Govindachandra of the Gahadavala dynasty. The Pithipatis were contemporaries and neighbors of the Gahadavalas to the west and the Pala dynasty to the east. The Pithis also maintained marital relations with the Karnat dynasty of Mithila in North Bihar.  
The Pithi chiefs were also noted for providing land to visiting Sri Lankan monks in Bodh Gaya so that they could build a monastery. Inscriptions from the period detail the granting of land to the Singhalasangha by Acarya Buddhasena. It also details how a nearby village called Kottahala was granted to a Sinhalese monk called Mangalavamsin for the maintenance of the Mahabodhi temple.

During the reign of Acarya Pithi Buddhasena, the region began to experience raids from Turkic invaders and was forced to swear fealty to them. This is detailed in the memoirs of the Tibetan pilgrim, Dharmasvamin who visited Bodh Gaya during this period.

Relations with neighbours
The sway of the Pithipatis probably only occasionally extended beyond the area of Bodh Gaya and Magadha. The Ramacharitam notes that the pithipatis paid a nominal nod to the Pala Empire but managed their own internal affairs. The earlier Pithipati King, Devaraksita were defeated by the Palas. It is likely that once the Pala dynasty ended they switched their allegiance to the Sena dynasty although they seem to have regained their power following the invasion of Bakhtiyar Khalji. Inscriptional evidence shows they may have helped in repairing the Odantapuri monastery situated 70km from Bodh Gaya.

List of rulers
Rough dates for the period of rule that each of the Pithipati kings reigned for:
Vallabharāja (1120–1160 CE)
Deśarāja (1160–1180 CE)
Devasthira (1180–1200 CE)
Buddhasena (1200–1240 CE)
Pūrnabhadra (1240–1255)
Jayasena (1255–1280)

After Jayasena, other rulers followed of which we know less about including Sangharaksita, Buddhasena II and Madhusena.

References

Kingdoms of Bihar
Buddhist dynasties of India
Magadha